Each year the Mr. Georgia Basketball award is given to the person chosen as the best high school boys basketball player in the U.S. state of Georgia.  The award winner is selected by members of the Atlanta Tip Off Club.

Award winners

See also
Miss Georgia Basketball

References

Mr. and Miss Basketball awards
Awards established in 1983
Lists of people from Georgia (U.S. state)
Mr. Georgia Basketball